Pharaoh's Army is a 1995 American Western film directed, written and produced by Robby Henson, starring Chris Cooper, Patricia Clarkson and Kris Kristofferson. The film takes place in southeastern Kentucky during the American Civil War and focuses on an uneasy encounter involving a small squadron of Union Army soldiers who take up residence at the farm of a woman whose husband is fighting in the Confederate States Army.

Plot
The story is narrated by an unnamed boy, now an old man, 'as best as he can remember'.

In the spring of 1862, in the Cumberland Mountains 'down near the Tennessee line', war sympathies were strongly divided, neighbors against neighbors.

After the unexplained death of Sarah Anders' (Clarkson) daughter at the hand of Yankees, the body is dug up from the grave and unceremoniously left exposed by Yankees, to add insult to Sarah's loss, as her husband is away fighting for the Confederacy.  Sarah also has a young teen-aged son, the boy. Sarah takes her daughter's body (in coffin) back to her homestead to rebury.

Captain John Hull Abston (Cooper), a Union army officer and a widower Ohio farmer before the war, commands a party of four soldiers scavenging for supplies. All are untested in battle. They arrive at Sarah's small cabin and take what little they can find.  In the process, the youngest soldier is seriously accidentally wounded, and the party has to stay there until the soldier is well enough to travel.

Sarah and the boy suffer the company of the raiding party for several days, but are not seriously harassed by them. In fact, the Captain takes pity on Sarah, and as they wait around, he even assists her in plowing a small patch of land to plant a corn crop, as 'he likes to work with mules'.

The boy sneaks away one night to advise nearby neighbor Preacher (Kristofferson), a minister and Confederate sympathizer, of their situation. The next day, one of the soldiers, disgusted by the situation, rides off to desert, and the captain starts to shoot him. Just then, sniper fire rings out, killing the deserter, and all take refuge in the cabin. Sarah and the boy think it's her husband doing the shooting. The captain eventually kills the sniper, and all discover it is not Sarah's husband. Later, Preacher comes to retrieve the sniper's body, as it is his Israel, his colored servant.

The captain buries the dead soldier next to Sarah's daughter's grave, which enrages Sarah and she becomes insanely distressed. The raiding party leaves, taking Sarah's wagon, mule and cow, but the captain leaves Sarah a rifle 'for the boy to shoot squirrels'. She attempts to shoot the captain as he rides away, but the rifle is empty. When they are out of sight, Sarah digs up the soldier, as the boy, after fetching a revolver he had earlier stolen from the party, runs after the raiders. The boy catches up to the party and shoots the wounded soldier, lying in the wagon, dead, and then flees; the captain pursues him, firing after him.

The captain returns to the cabin with the body in the wagon, and the mule, looking for the boy. The captain chastises the boy for killing the young soldier, and Sarah and the captain argue. The captain, frustrated, threatens to kill them, and Sarah, frustrated, says "Go ahead. Kill us." The upset captain fires two rounds into the air, asks that the dead soldier be provided a decent Christian burial, then returns to the other two of his party. They ask "What'd you do to 'em?", and he replies, "You heard the shots."  They continue on their way.
 
Because 'the Civil War was not about 'being decent,' Sarah and the boy throw the first soldier killed into the creek, to wash downstream. They dump the body of the other soldier into a sinkhole near a fallen sycamore, and throw some dirt on it. Sarah's husband never did return.

Cast
 Kris Kristofferson as Confederate preacher
 Patricia Clarkson as Sarah Anders
 Chris Cooper as Captain John Hull Abston

Production
The title is taken from Preacher alluding to the boy the story from the Old Testament, about pharaoh's army (the North) being sent to smite Israel (the South), and how it was destroyed.

According to director/producer/writer Robby Henson, Pharaoh's Army was inspired by Shelby Foote's books about the war between the North and South, and 'is based on a true story.'

Kristofferson, who appears in just a few scenes, was the only 'big name' star at the time. His daughter Tracy acted as associate producer, and got him involved in the project.

References

External links
 

1995 films
American Civil War films
Films directed by Robby Henson
1990s English-language films
1990s American films